The Melodi Grand Prix Junior 2005 was Norway's fourth national Melodi Grand Prix Junior for young singers aged 8 to 15. It was held on May 28, 2005, in Oslo Spektrum, Oslo, Norway with a live broadcast of an hour and 15 minutes presented by Stian Barsnes-Simonsen and Nadia Hasnaoui. 10 participants competed, The contest was won by 9-year-old Malin Reitan with her song "Sommer og skolefri". She received the award out of the hands of @lek, who won the 2004 contest. During the interval, Wig Wam performed "In My Dreams" and Jorun Stiansen performed "This Is the Night".

Malin, who didn't turn 10 until August, went on to represent Norway in the 2005 Junior Eurovision Song Contest, where she placed 3rd.

The album Melodi Grand Prix Junior 2005 containing the songs of the finals reached No. 1 on the VG-lista Norwegian Albums Chart on week 23 of 2005 staying at the top of the charts for 1 week.

Results

First round

Super Final

Melodi Grand Prix Junior
Music festivals in Norway
Events in Oslo
2005 in Norwegian music